Melissa Marie Mathison (June 3, 1950 – November 4, 2015) was an American film and television screenwriter and an activist for the Tibetan independence movement. She was best known for writing the screenplays for the films The Black Stallion (1979) and E.T. the Extra-Terrestrial (1982), the latter of which earned her the Saturn Award for Best Writing and a nomination for the Academy Award for Best Original Screenplay.

Mathison later wrote The Indian in the Cupboard (1995), based on Lynne Reid Banks's 1980 children's novel of the same name, and Kundun (1997), a biographical-drama film about the Dalai Lama. Her final film credit was The BFG (2016), which marked her third collaboration with film director Steven Spielberg.

Early years
Mathison was born on June 3, 1950, in Los Angeles, one of five siblings. Her father, Richard Randolph Mathison, was the Los Angeles bureau chief of Newsweek. Her mother was Margaret Jean (née Kieffer) Mathison, a food writer and convenience-foods entrepreneur. After graduating from Providence High School in 1968, Mathison attended the University of California, Berkeley. Her family was friendly with Francis Ford Coppola, whose children were babysat by Mathison. Coppola offered her a job as his assistant on The Godfather Part II (1974), an opportunity for which she left her studies at UC Berkeley.

With Coppola’s encouragement, she wrote a script for The Black Stallion, adapted from the novel, that caught Steven Spielberg's attention.

Screenwriting and production credits
Mathison wrote the screenplay for E.T. the Extra-Terrestrial (1982) in collaboration with Steven Spielberg. It was nominated for an Oscar for Best Original Screenplay. The script was based on a story, written by John Sayles, that Spielberg provided to Mathison during the filming of Raiders of the Lost Ark (1981). Spielberg attributes the line "E.T. phone home" to Mathison. She collaborated again with Spielberg for The BFG (2016), her final film, which was dedicated in her memory. She also had film credits for The Escape Artist (1982) and The Indian in the Cupboard (1995).

Dalai Lama
Mathison met the Dalai Lama in 1990 when she was writing the script for Kundun (1997) and developed a lasting friendship with him. She continued to work as an activist for Tibetan freedom and was on the board of the International Campaign for Tibet.

Personal life and death
From 1983 to 2004, Mathison was married to Harrison Ford; the couple had two children. She died on November 4, 2015, in Los Angeles, aged 65, from neuroendocrine cancer.

Screenwriting filmography

References

External links

1950 births
2015 deaths
Screenwriters from California
American women screenwriters
Tibet freedom activists
Writers from Los Angeles
University of California, Berkeley alumni
20th-century American writers
20th-century American women writers
21st-century American writers
21st-century American women writers
Deaths from cancer in California
Deaths from neuroendocrine cancer
Activists from Los Angeles
Women science fiction and fantasy writers